The Christchurch-Campbell was an English automobile manufactured only in 1922 by J Campbell Ltd of Christchurch, Dorset (then in Hampshire), England. An assembled car, it had a 1436 cc 10-8hp Coventry-Simplex engine and Meadows gearbox.  At £495 for a two-seater the car was expensive and less than 10 were built.

See also
 List of car manufacturers of the United Kingdom

References
David Burgess Wise, The New Illustrated Encyclopedia of Automobiles.
Beaulieu Encyclopedia of the Automobile. Editor Nick G.N. Georgano. The Stationery Office, 2000. 

Defunct motor vehicle manufacturers of England